My Cute Fiend Sweet Princess is Kimya Dawson's second solo album, released concurrently with Knock Knock Who? in 2003.

Track listing 

 "Chemistry"
 "Velvet Rabbit"
 "Hadlock Padlock"
 "Being Cool"
 "Anthrax"
 "The Beer"
 "Will You Be Me?"
 "Everything's Alright"
 "For Katie"

References 

Kimya Dawson albums
2003 albums
Important Records albums